The 1889 Harvard Crimson football team represented Harvard University in the 1889 college football season. The Crimson finished with a 9–2 record.  The team won its first ten games by a combined score of 404–6, but lost its last two games, against Princeton and Yale, giving up 41 points against Princeton.

Three Harvard players were selected as first-team players on the 1889 College Football All-America Team: end and team Arthur Cumnock, halfback James P. Lee, and guard John Cranston.

Schedule

References

Harvard
Harvard Crimson football seasons
Harvard Crimson football